Mark James Francis (born 12 December 1994) is an English footballer who plays as a winger for Didcot Town.

Career

Swindon Town
Francis began his footballing career within Portsmouth's academy set-up.

At the age of 16 Francis was released by Portsmouth and joined the Swindon Town after writing to Under-18's coach Paul Bodin to request a trial.

With Swindon Town suffering an injury crisis, Mark Francis was among the youth players selected for first team duty by Swindon Town manager Kevin MacDonald. Francis made his Swindon debut as a second-half substitute.

References

External links

Playing stats at Aylesbury United

1994 births
Sportspeople from Dorchester, Dorset
English footballers
Living people
Swindon Town F.C. players
A.F.C. Totton players
Frome Town F.C. players
Chippenham Town F.C. players
Didcot Town F.C. players
Wantage Town F.C. players
Salisbury F.C. players
Evesham United F.C. players
Association football wingers